A rivethead or rivet head is a person associated with the industrial dance music scene. In stark contrast to the original industrial culture, whose performers and heterogeneous audience were sometimes referred to as "industrialists", the rivethead scene is a coherent youth culture closely linked to a discernible fashion style. The scene emerged in the late 1980s on the basis of electro-industrial, EBM, and industrial rock music. The associated dress style draws on military fashion and punk aesthetics with hints of fetish wear, mainly inspired by the scene's musical protagonists.

Origins of the term 
Initially, the term rivethead had been used since the 1940s as a nickname for North American automotive assembly line and steel construction workers and hit the mainstream through the publication of Ben Hamper's Rivethead: Tales From the Assembly Line, which is otherwise unrelated to the subculture.

Glenn Chase, founder of San Diego label Re-Constriction Records, is responsible for the term's meaning in the 1990s. In 1993, he released Rivet Head Culture, a compilation that contains several electro-industrial and industrial rock acts from the American underground music scene. In the same year, industrial rock group Chemlab − whose members were close friends of Chase − had released their debut album Burn Out at the Hydrogen Bar, which includes a track called "Rivet Head". Chemlab singer Jared Louche said he did not remember where the term came from, although he stated that this song title was in his mind for years.

Music 
The rivethead scene is remotely related but not directly connected to the industrial music culture. Industrial music is a genre of experimental and avantgardist music, intertwined with graphical visualization (mostly with disturbing graphical content). The absence of conventional song structures, such as rhythm and melody, is a main characteristic of the genre, whereas the music preferred by the rivethead scene includes several danceable and song-oriented styles that are sometimes considered "post-industrial". Like post-punk, the term post-industrial describes a musical genre that developed distinctly from its roots and turned into several strands of sound, namely electro-industrial, electronic body music, and industrial rock, often referred to as industrial dance music. Those styles differ from traditional industrial music regarding aesthetics, sound, and production techniques.

Aesthetics 
The rivethead dress style has been inspired by military aesthetics, complemented by fashion "that mimics the grit and grime of industrial sectors in major metropolitan areas". Additionally, it borrows elements of punk fashion, such as a fanned and dyed Mohawk hairstyle, and fetish wear such as black leather and PVC tops, pants and shorts  partly supplemented with modern primitive body modifications such as tattoos and piercings.

Occasionally, rivetheads emphasize a post-apocalyptic, dystopian influence, often inspired by movies, e.g. Mad Max (1979), Escape from New York (1981), Gunhed (1989), Death Machine (1994), and Strange Days (1995). Several movies, such as Hardware (1990), Strange Days and Johnny Mnemonic (1995), feature music tracks by Ministry, KMFDM, Diatribe, Stabbing Westward and other bands associated with the rivethead culture. Other influences include sci-fi archetypes such as Lupus Yonderboy and Razorgirl, characters from the Sprawl trilogy by William Gibson.

Below some basic characteristics of the rivethead dress style. As a divergence from the extravagance of youth cultures such as New Romantic, goth, cyber, and steampunk, the idea is to make a statement with as few fashion components as possible. The rivethead look commonly is unadorned and epitomizes a direct reflection of the social environment ("street survival wear").

Male 
 Tops: Black, gray or olive tank tops, plain t-shirts, band shirts, sleeveless shirts (sometimes with the sleeves ripped off), tie-dye crinkle or burst pattern shirts; black leather jackets (frequently painted with band logos), and MA-1 flight jackets.
 Pants: Cargo and BDU paratrooper pants, ripped jeans, vintage shorts, often but not always black or Woodland camouflage; usually tucked into boots, rolled at the bottom cuffs or worn as cut-off shorts. Black leather pants and bondage pants are sometimes worn.
 Footwear: Combat boots, steel-toe boots or low shoes, such as Dr. Martens, Gripfasts, Grinders and Underground shoes.
 Hair: Partially shaved (undercut), flattop, Mohawk or completely shaved. Sometimes long hair in combination with undercut or dreadlocks.
 Accessories: Teashades and Ray-Ban Aviator sunglasses. Battle Dress Uniform-style or military belts; bracelets and dog tags; fingerless leather gloves; sometimes jewelry that incorporates industrial elements such as nails, screws and cogs. Suspenders, or "braces", normally worn hanging off trousers or shorts.
 Body modification: Primarily piercings and tattoos.

Female 
Rivetgirls may dress along with the femme fatale look: sexuality as power. Common are fetish wear, such as black PVC and leather corsages, miniskirts, ankle-deep or knee-high stiletto heel boots; less makeup than Goths and 1980s New Wave fashion girls, who were also an influence on the late-1980s/early 1990s rivetgirl style (cf. fishnet tights, stilettos, Dr. Martens low boots). Often dyed hair (black, sometimes red or blonde) that is long, short, spiked, partially shaved (see Maria Azevedo of Battery and Yone Dudas of Decoded Feedback) or dreadlocked (see Anna Christine of Luxt). On the other hand, the female rivethead fashion look may be and often is identical to the tough style of the male rivetheads (Tank Girl aesthetic; military wear such as tank tops, paratrooper pants and combat boots). Kim X, co-founder of California-based music label COP International, compared the female rivethead attitude to the Riot grrrl movement.

Comparison with goth subculture 
The rivethead scene of the 1980s and 1990s was different from the goth subculture in ideological and musical terms, as well as in their visual aesthetics. Confusion regarding the boundaries of those two youth cultures has heightened because of the late-1990s "multi-subcultural" cross-hybridization, which led people to incorrectly believe that rivetheads are an offshoot of the goth subculture. Canadian novelist and author Nancy Kilpatrick labelled this youth-cultural overlap "industrial goth", as does Julia Borden. ( − Note: In the heyday of the rivethead culture, the term "industrial goth" as a description of a youth culture did not exist).

Goths are a dark romantic outgrowth of the punk and post-punk movements that emerged in the early 1980s while rivetheads developed from the industrial dance music scene that came to be in the second half of the 1980s, hand in hand with the media success of post-industrial artists such as Skinny Puppy, Front 242, Front Line Assembly, Ministry, KMFDM, and Numb. The rivethead scene is a male-dominated youth subculture that shows a provocative, insurgent as well as socio-critical approach. The Goth subculture is “equally open to women, men and transgendered people”, and frequently devoid of any interest in ethical activism or political involvements.

See also

 Cyberpunk
 Electronic body music
 Industrial music
List of industrial music festivals

References

External links 
 A Prehistory of Industrial Music

Youth culture
Underground culture
Industrial music
Musical subcultures
History of fashion